Mizoch is an urban-type settlement in Zdolbuniv Raion, Rivne Oblast, Ukraine, 30 km far from Rivne.

History
The first written record goes back to 1322. The confirmation of the city's legal status dates from 1429. In 1761, the King Augustus III of Poland granted Mizocz the Magdeburg Rights. The civic self-government placed the city Velykyi Mizoch (Greater Mizoch) in the Luts'k district. Between world wars, Mizocz was a multi-ethnic community like many others in eastern Poland, inhabited by Jews, Poles, and Ukrainians. There was a military school in Mizocz for the officer cadets of the Battalion 11 of the Polish Army's First Brigade; the Karwicki Palace (built in 1790, partly destroyed by the Bolsheviks in 1917), Hotel Barmocha Fuksa, a Catholic and an Orthodox church, and a Synagogue. The nearest major city was Równo.

In World War II, the town was invaded twice. It fell under the Nazi occupation in 1941. The Jewish inhabitants were first forced into the newly formed Mizocz Ghetto, from which they were taken out and slaughtered at a nearby ravine.

In January 1989, the population was 4220 people.

The Gonfalon and modern emblem were approved by the city council on September 11, 1996.

Notable residents
Sonia Peres, the wife of President and Prime Minister of Israel, Shimon Peres.

Gallery

References

External links 

 

Urban-type settlements in Rivne Raion
Volhynian Governorate
Wołyń Voivodeship (1921–1939)
Holocaust locations in Ukraine